is a Japanese football club based in Kitakyushu, Fukuoka Prefecture. They currently play in J3 League, Japan's 3rd tier of professional league football.

History

Mitsubishi Chemical SC (1947–2000) 
The club was formed in 1947 as part of Mitsubishi Chemical's Kurosaki factory. The club was a founding member of Kyushu regional league since 1973. Most of its career was spent in the regional and prefectural leagues, as Kitakyushu was represented in the Japan Soccer League by Yahata Steel F.C. Yahata was a founding member of the JSL in 1965, and finished as runner-up in its first two seasons in that league. Yahata was renamed New Nippon Steel F.C. in 1970, when Yahata Steel merged with Fuji Steel to form (New) Nippon Steel. It ultimately was relegated to the Second Division in 1982, then relegated from the Second Division to Kyushu regional league after 1990–91 season, and closed in 1999.

New Wave Kitakyushu (2001–2009) 
In 2001, the club became a community-oriented club (New Wave) Kitakyushu F.C.

In 2007 New Wave took second place in the Regional League promotion series, and was promoted to the JFL for the 2008 season.

The club applied for J. League Associate Membership in January 2008, and the application was accepted at the J. League board meeting on February 19, 2008.

On 1 April 2009, the club made an announcement that they would be accepting suggestions for a new name. This was because the name "New Wave" may cause trademark or tradename disputes. Therefore, the new name had to be something not yet registered as a trademark.

Giravanz Kitakyushu (2010–) 
On 2 October 2009, they announced that the new club name for the 2010 season would be . According to the official news release, the name "Giravanz" is coined from two Italian words: "Girasole", which means "sunflower", and "Avanzare", which means "moving forward". (The sunflower is one of Kitakyushu's symbol flowers.)

On 23 November 2009, after a 2–1 win away against Arte Takasaki, Kitakyushu secured a top four position in the JFL for the 2009 season, regardless of the result at the final week of 2009 JFL. This means they will play in J. League Division 2 for the 2010 season, something which was confirmed by the J.League board meeting on 30 November 2009.

In its inaugural year in the pro ranks, despite attaining a large number of draw matches, Kitakyushu set new records for fewest wins and points in the season standings.

After several seasons in J2 League, on 20 November 2016 they suffered their first relegation to J3 League.

After the 2018 J3 League season when they eventually ranked bottom, they named Shinji Kobayashi as the new manager, who also took a role as the newly-established Sports Director position concurrently. In 2019 J3 League, Kobayashi led the club to become the champions & promoted to the 2020 J2 League. Although they are successful enough as far as ranked top at the end of the first half, and eventually ranked 5th at the end of the 2020 season, they had a dozen of key players, including Akira Silvano Disaro who scored 18 goals in 2020 season, transferred to other clubs after the season. In 2021, they have ranked at or near the bottom for the entire season, which resulted in suffering relegation to the 2022 J3 League, becoming the first J.-League club relegated to the J3 League a second time. The club will play its 2nd consecutive season in the J3 on 2023.

Stadium 
Giravanz played in the Honjo Athletic Stadium from 2010 until 2016.

Giravanz moved to the Mikuni World Stadium Kitakyushu, having played at there since 2017.

League and cup record 

Key

Honours 
J3 League 1
2019
Kyushu Soccer League 8
1973, 1981, 1982, 1983, 1984, 1987, 1989, 2007

Current squad 
As of 5 March 2023.

Coaching Staff 
For the 2023 season.

Managerial history

Colour, sponsors and manufacturers

Kit evolution

References

External links 
Official "Giravanz" site (in Japanese)
Kitakyushu Football Club (in Japanese) club organization and subsidiary teams

 
Football clubs in Japan
J.League clubs
Sport in Kitakyushu
Sports teams in Fukuoka Prefecture
Association football clubs established in 2001
2001 establishments in Japan
Japan Football League clubs